Hugh "Bummer" Stirling (born October 23, 1907, in London, Ontario, died May 28, 1994, in Calgary, Alberta) was a star football player for ten seasons for the Sarnia Imperials of the Ontario Rugby Football Union. He was inducted into the Canadian Football Hall of Fame in 1966 and into the Canada's Sports Hall of Fame in 1975.

References
 Canada's Sports Hall of Fame profile

1907 births
1994 deaths
Canadian Football Hall of Fame inductees
Ontario Rugby Football Union players
Players of Canadian football from Ontario
Sarnia Imperials players
Sportspeople from London, Ontario